Manuel Ramos (November 20, 1942 – June 6, 1999), nicknamed Pulgarcito (Tom Thumb), was a Mexican boxer and actor.  He was the heavyweight champion of Mexico, a top world title contender in the late 1960s, and one of Mexico's most internationally successful heavyweights. On June 24, 1968, Ramos became the first Mexican to challenge for the heavyweight crown when he fought reigning champion Joe Frazier at Madison Square Garden in New York City.

Biography
Manuel Ramos was born in Hermosillo, Sonora, Mexico.  He boxed professionally for two to three years in the early 1960s, but records of this period have not been preserved.  He defeated Indio Lopez for the Mexican heavyweight title on June 24, 1963 by first-round knockout.  He next fought a series of American opponents in Los Angeles area venues, attaining a mixed record of 5-6-2.

His fortunes improved dramatically from 1966 to 1968, with a string of 13 victories, including a split decision over former title contender Eddie Machen and a unanimous decision over former WBA champion Ernie Terrell. This led to him being ranked #4 by The Ring Magazine and set up a title match with NYSAC World Champion Joe Frazier.

The bout was held at Madison Square Garden on June 24, 1968. The iconic arena had just opened four months earlier, and Ramos was the first Mexican fighter to appear there.  The match was an intense two-round battle, in which Ramos briefly staggered Frazier, but was then knocked down twice and lost by referee's stoppage when he signaled that he was unable to continue.  This was to be Ramos's only world title fight.

He continued to be ranked as a top heavyweight through the end of the 1960s, but losses to George Chuvalo, Jack O'Halloran, and Chuck Wepner (in which Ramos inflicted serious cuts on his opponent but went on to lose by unanimous decision) marked the beginning of his decline.  After a period as a gatekeeper for up-and-coming heavyweights in the early 1970s, he lost 15 straight fights and retired from boxing in 1977.

Outside of the ring, Ramos had roles in the Mexican films Nosotros los feos (1973) and El Loco Bronco (1989).

He worked as an office manager in the Mexican Navy, resigning in 1995.

Manuel Ramos died from a heart attack in Mexico City on June 6, 1999.

Professional boxing record

|-
| style="text-align:center;" colspan="8"|24 Wins (19 knockouts, 5 decisions), 29 Losses (9 knockouts, 19 decisions, 1 disqualification), 3 Draws
|-  style="text-align:center; background:#e3e3e3;"
|  style="border-style:none none solid solid; "|Res.
|  style="border-style:none none solid solid; "|Record
|  style="border-style:none none solid solid; "|Opponent
|  style="border-style:none none solid solid; "|Type
|  style="border-style:none none solid solid; "|Round
|  style="border-style:none none solid solid; "|Date
|  style="border-style:none none solid solid; "|Location
|  style="border-style:none none solid solid; "|Notes
|- align=center
|Loss
|24-29-3
|align=left| Bob Hazelton
|
|2 
|June 30, 1977
|align=left| Marshall, Texas
|align=left|
|- align=center
|Loss
|24-28-3
|align=left| Ruben Rivera
|
|1 
|January 1, 1977
|align=left| Monterrey, Nuevo León
|align=left|date uncertain
|- align=center
|Loss
|24-27-3
|align=left| Bernardo Mercado       
|
|5 
|May 13, 1976
|align=left| Civic Auditorium, Albuquerque, New Mexico
|align=left| 
|- align=center
|Loss
|24-26-3
|align=left| Fernando Montes
|
|7 
|October 3, 1975
|align=left| Nuevo Laredo, Tamaulipas
|align=left| 
|- align=center
|Loss
|24-25-3
|align=left| Moi Martinez
|
|10 
|November 17, 1974  
|align=left| Reynosa, Tamaulipas
|align=left| 
|- align=center
|Loss
|24-24-3
|align=left| Duane Bobick
|
|7 
|September 15, 1973  
|align=left| Scope Arena, Norfolk, Virginia
|align=left| 
|- align=center
|Loss
|24-23-3
|align=left| Armando Zanini
|
|8
|June 15, 1973 
|align=left| Milan, Lombardy
|align=left| 
|- align=center
|Loss
|24-22-3
|align=left| Luis Faustino Pires
|
|10
|May 5, 1973
|align=left| Ginásio Presidente Médici, Brasília, Distrito Federal
|align=left| 
|- align=center
|Loss
|24-21-3
|align=left| John Hudgins
|
|4 
|March 24, 1972 
|align=left| International Amphitheatre, Chicago, Illinois
|align=left| 
|- align=center
|Loss
|24-20-3
|align=left| Ron Lyle
|
|10
|October 9, 1971 
|align=left| Auditorium Arena, Denver, Colorado
|align=left| 
|- align=center
|Loss
|24-19-3
|align=left| Ron Stander
|
|10
|August 26, 1971 
|align=left| City Auditorium, Omaha, Nebraska
|align=left| 
|- align=center
|Loss
|24-18-3
|align=left| Terry Daniels
|
|10
|July 26, 1971
|align=left| Astrodome, Houston, Texas
|align=left| 
|- align=center
|Loss
|24-17-3
|align=left| Elmo Henderson
|
|10
|May 14, 1971  
|align=left| Nuevo Laredo, Tamaulipas
|align=left| 
|- align=center
|Loss
|24-16-3
|align=left| Jack Bodell
|
|10
|April 13, 1971 
|align=left| Civic Hall, Wolverhampton, West Midlands
|align=left| 
|- align=center
|Loss
|24-15-3
|align=left| Jürgen Blin
|
|10
|April 2, 1971
|align=left| Cologne, North Rhine-Westphalia
|align=left| 
|- align=center
|Win
|24-14-3
|align=left| Joe Murphy Goodwin
|
|3 
|March 16, 1971 
|align=left| Oklahoma City, Oklahoma
|align=left| 
|- align=center
|Loss
|23-14-3
|align=left| José Roman
|
|10
|October 26, 1970
|align=left| San Juan
|align=left| 
|- align=center
|Draw
|23-13-3
|align=left| Ron Stander
|
|10
|September 17, 1970
|align=left| City Auditorium, Omaha, Nebraska
|align=left| 
|- align=center
|Loss
|23-13-2
|align=left| Jimmy Richards
|
|10
|August 29, 1970
|align=left| Ellis Park Stadium, Johannesburg, Gauteng
|align=left| 
|- align=center
|Loss
|23-12-2
|align=left| Oscar Bonavena
|
|1 
|May 9, 1970 
|align=left| Luna Park, Buenos Aires
|align=left| 
|- align=center
|Loss
|23-11-2
|align=left| Joe Bugner
|
|8
|March 24, 1970 
|align=left| Wembley Stadium, London
|align=left| 
|- align=center
|Win
|23-10-2
|align=left| Dub GW Manis
|
|8 
|March 3, 1970
|align=left| Oklahoma City, Oklahoma
|align=left| 
|- align=center
|Loss
|22-10-2
|align=left| Chuck Wepner
|
|10
|January 26, 1970
|align=left| Madison Square Garden, New York, New York
|align=left| 
|- align=center
|Loss
|22-9-2
|align=left| Jack O'Halloran
|
|7 
|October 17, 1969  
|align=left| The Forum, Inglewood, California
|align=left| 
|- align=center
|Win
|22-8-2
|align=left| Tony Doyle
|
|10
|September 11, 1969
|align=left| Olympic Auditorium, Los Angeles, California
|align=left| 
|- align=center
|Loss
|21-8-2
|align=left| George Chuvalo
|
|5 
|September 26, 1968  
|align=left| Madison Square Garden, New York, New York
|align=left| 
|- align=center
|Win
|21-7-2
|align=left| Earl Averette
|
|4 
|August 27, 1968 
|align=left| Municipal Auditorium, San Antonio, Texas
|align=left| 
|- align=center
|Loss
|20-7-2
|align=left| Joe Frazier
|
|2 
|June 24, 1968 
|align=left| Madison Square Garden, New York, New York
|align=left| NYSAC heavyweight title fight
|- align=center
|Win
|20-6-2
|align=left| Ron Reiter
|
|1 
|May 4, 1968
|align=left| Nogales, Veracruz
|align=left| 
|- align=center
|Win
|19-6-2
|align=left| Everett Copeland
|
|10
|March 17, 1968
|align=left| Culiacán, Sinaloa
|align=left| 
|- align=center
|Win
|18-6-2
|align=left| Ernie Terrell
|
|10
|October 14, 1967
|align=left| Estadio Azteca, Mexico City
|align=left| 
|- align=center
|Win
|17-6-2
|align=left| Johnny Featherman
|
|3 
|August 9, 1967
|align=left| Mérida, Yucatán
|align=left| 
|- align=center
|Win
|16-6-2
|align=left| Floyd Joyner
|
|2 
|May 25, 1967
|align=left| Puebla, Puebla
|align=left| 
|- align=center
|Win
|15-6-2
|align=left| James J. Woody
|
|2 
|January 29, 1967
|align=left| El Toreo de Cuatro Caminos, Mexico City
|align=left| 
|- align=center
|Win
|14-6-2
|align=left| Max Martinez
|
|2 
|December 19, 1966 
|align=left| Reynosa, Tamaulipas
|align=left| 
|- align=center
|Win
|13-6-2
|align=left| Don Koontz
|
|2 
|October 22, 1966
|align=left| El Toreo, Mexico City
|align=left| 
|- align=center
|Win
|12-6-2
|align=left| Dave Centi
|
|3 
|September 11, 1966
|align=left| Plaza de Toros, Ciudad Juárez, Chihuahua
|align=left| 
|- align=center
|Win
|11-6-2
|align=left| Wayne Heath
|
|2 
|August 7, 1966
|align=left| Plaza México, Mexico City
|align=left| 
|- align=center
|Win
|10-6-2
|align=left| Eddie Machen
|
|10
|June 3, 1966
|align=left| Sports Arena, Los Angeles, California
|align=left| 
|- align=center
|Win
|9-6-2
|align=left| Archie Ray
|
|8 
|May 16, 1966  
|align=left| Veterans Memorial Coliseum, Phoenix, Arizona
|align=left| 
|- align=center
|Win
|8-6-2
|align=left| Lars Olof Norling
|
|8 
|May 5, 1966 
|align=left| Olympic Auditorium, Los Angeles, California
|align=left| 
|- align=center
|Win
|7-6-2
|align=left| John Henry Jackson
|
|2 
|April 23, 1966
|align=left| Pacific International Arena, Portland, Oregon, Oregon
|align=left| 
|- align=center
|Win
|6-6-2
|align=left| Jerry Simms
|
|6 
|March 31, 1966
|align=left| Olympic Auditorium, Los Angeles, California
|align=left| 
|- align=center
|Loss
|5-6-2
|align=left| Lars Olof Norling
|
|6 
|December 9, 1965 
|align=left| Olympic Auditorium, Los Angeles, California
|align=left| accidental headbutt
|- align=center
|Draw
|5-5-2
|align=left| George Johnson
|
|10
|November 4, 1965 
|align=left| Olympic Auditorium, Los Angeles, California
|align=left| 
|- align=center
|Loss
|5-5-1
|align=left| Joey Orbillo
|
|10
|October 7, 1965
|align=left| Olympic Auditorium, Los Angeles, California
|align=left| 
|- align=center
|Loss
|5-4-1
|align=left| Wayne Heath
|
|10
|September 9, 1965
|align=left| Olympic Auditorium, Los Angeles, California
|align=left| 
|- align=center
|Loss
|5-3-1
|align=left| Ski Goldstein
|
|10
|February 5, 1965
|align=left| Olympic Auditorium, Los Angeles, California
|align=left| 
|- align=center
|Draw
|5-2-1
|align=left| Joey Orbillo
|
|8
|August 13, 1964  
|align=left| Olympic Auditorium, Los Angeles, California
|align=left| 
|- align=center
|Loss
|5-2
|align=left| Henry Clark
|
|10
|July 16, 1964
|align=left| Olympic Auditorium, Los Angeles, California
|align=left| 
|- align=center
|Loss
|5-1
|align=left| Al Carter
|
|10
|May 12, 1964 
|align=left| Valley Garden Arena, North Hollywood, California
|align=left| 
|- align=center
|Win
|5-0
|align=left| Sam Pride
|
|3 
|April 28, 1964  
|align=left| Valley Garden Arena, North Hollywood, California
|align=left| 
|- align=center
|Win
|4-0
|align=left| Al Carter
|
|6
|March 17, 1964  
|align=left| Valley Garden Arena, North Hollywood, California
|align=left| 
|- align=center
|Win
|3-0
|align=left| Larry McGee
|
|3 
|February 18, 1964 
|align=left| Valley Garden Arena, North Hollywood, California
|align=left| 
|- align=center
|Win
|2-0
|align=left| Kid Apache
|
|4 
|January 23, 1964 
|align=left| Olympic Auditorium, Los Angeles, California
|align=left| 
|- align=center
|Win
|1-0
|align=left| Indio Lopez
|
|1 
|June 24, 1963
|align=left| Mexico City
|align=left| Mexico heavyweight title
|}

References

External links
 

1942 births
1999 deaths
Boxers from Sonora
Heavyweight boxers
Sportspeople from Hermosillo
Mexican male boxers
Mexican male actors
20th-century Mexican people